The 2017–18 Bucknell Bison men's basketball team represented Bucknell University during the 2017–18 NCAA Division I men's basketball season. The Bison, led by third-year head coach Nathan Davis, played their home games at Sojka Pavilion in Lewisburg, Pennsylvania as members of the Patriot League. They finished the season 25–10, 16–2 in Patriot League to win the Patriot League regular season championship. They defeated Loyola (MD), Boston University, and Colgate to win the Patriot League tournament championship. As a result, they received the Patriot League's automatic bid to the NCAA tournament where they lost in the first round to Michigan State.

Previous season
The Bison finished the 2016–17 season 23–8, 15–3 in Patriot League play to win the regular season championship, their third straight title and sixth in seven years. In the Patriot League tournament, they defeated Army, Navy, and Lehigh to win the tournament championship. As a result, the Bison received the conference's automatic bid to the NCAA tournament as the No. 13 seed in the West region. There they lost in the first round to West Virginia.

Offseason

2017 recruiting class 

Source

Preseason 
In a preseason poll of league head coaches and sports information directors, Bucknell was picked to win the Patriot League, receiving all 18 first-place votes. Senior center Nana Foulland was named the preseason Patriot League Player of the Year. Senior forward Zach Thomas was also named to the preseason All-Patriot League first team.

Roster

Schedule and results

|-
!colspan=9 style=|Exhibition

|-
!colspan=9 style=| Non-conference regular season

|-
!colspan=9 style=| Patriot League regular season

|-
!colspan=9 style=| Patriot League tournament

|-
!colspan=9 style=| NCAA tournament

Source

References

Bucknell Bison men's basketball seasons
Bucknell
Bucknell
Bucknell
Bucknell